Pallini is a suburban town in Greater Athens Area and a municipality in East Attica, Greece. The seat of the municipality is the town Gerakas. It is the seat of administration of the East Attica regional unit.

Geography

Pallini is situated in the eastern part of the Athens conurbation, at about 150 m elevation. It lies in a plain between the mountains Penteliko and Hymettus. It is 2 km east of Gerakas and 14 km east of Athens city centre. Its built-up area is continuous with those of the neighbouring suburbs Gerakas and Anthousa. Pallini station, west of the town centre, is served by commuter trains and Athens metro. Greek National Road 54 (Athens - Rafina) passes through Pallini. The municipal unit Pallini includes the subdivision of Leontari.

Municipality

The municipality Pallini was formed at the 2011 local government reform by the merger of the following 3 former municipalities, that became municipal units:
Anthousa
Gerakas
Pallini

The municipality has an area of 29.430 km2, the municipal unit 18.932 km2.

Historical population

Notable people 
Dimitri Nanopoulos (1948-), physicist
Katerina Stefanidi (1990-), Olympic gold medalist in the women's pole vault

Gallery

See also
List of municipalities of Attica

References

External links
Official website 
https://web.archive.org/web/20050309025919/http://www.de.sch.gr/~anpapad/pallini.htm

Municipalities of Attica
Populated places in East Attica